One Love may refer to:

Music
 One Love (record producer), Timothy Sommers, American record producer, half of the duo Kinetics & One Love
 One Love: The Bob Marley Musical, a 2015 stage musical

Albums
 One Love (Blue album) or the title song (see below), 2002
 One Love (David Guetta album) or the title song (see below), 2009
 One Love (Delakota album), 1998
 One Love (Dr. Alban album) or the title song (see below), 1992
 One Love (Glay album) or the title song, 2001
 One Love (Kimberley Locke album), 2004
 One Love (New Edition album), 2004
 One Love (Tata Young album) or the title song, 2008
 One Love: The Very Best of Bob Marley & The Wailers or the title song (see below), 2001
 NME in Association with War Child Presents 1 Love, a 2002 charity compilation album

Songs 
 "One Love/People Get Ready", by Bob Marley, 1965 and 1977
 "One Love" (A. R. Rahman song), 2007
 "One Love" (Arashi song), 2008
 "One Love" (Blue song), 2002
 "One Love" (Carlene Carter song), 1991
 "One Love" (Carpenters song), 1971
 "One Love" (David Guetta song), 2009
 "One Love" (Dr. Alban song), 1992
 "One Love" (Jennifer Lopez song), 2011
 "One Love" (Johnson & Häggkvist song), 2008
 "One Love" (Marianas Trench song), 2015
 "One Love" (Nas song), 1994
 "One Love" (The Prodigy song), 1993
 "One Love" (The Stone Roses song), 1990
 "One Love (No Question)", by Toshinori Yonekura, 2008
 "1 Luv", by E-40 from In a Major Way, 1995
 "1 Love", by Ayumi Hamasaki from Secret, 2006
 "One Love", by Aiden from Conviction, 2007
 "One Love", by Dohzi-T featuring Shimizu Shota, 2007
 "One Love", by Flobots from Flobots Present... Platypus, 2005
 "One Love", by Hootie & The Blowfish from Looking for Lucky, 2005
 "One Love", by Ian Dury & The Blockheads from Ten More Turnips from the Tip, 2002
 "One Love", by Jordan Pruitt from Permission to Fly, 2008
 "One Love", by Justin Bieber from Believe, 2012
 "One Love", by Massive Attack from Blue Lines, 1991
 "One Love", by The Outfield from Extra Innings, 1999
 "One Love", by Tess Mattisson, 2000
 "One Love", by Trey Songz from Ready, 2009
 "One Love", by Whodini from Back in Black, 1986

Other uses
 One Love (2003 film), a Jamaican romance film
 One Love, a 2010–2011 London art installation curated by Kilford
 OneLove human rights campaign

See also
 Livity (spiritual concept), a concept of proper life based on Old Testament and African beliefs and traditions
 One Love Peace Concert, a large concert in 1978 in Kingston, Jamaica
 One Love Manchester, a 2017 concert in memory of the victims of the 2017 Manchester Attack in the UK